Jefferson Eulises Murillo Aguilar (born 18 January 1992) is a Colombian professional footballer who plays as a left back for América de Cali.

Club career
Born in Palmira, Valle del Cauca, Murillo was a Deportivo Cali youth graduate. He made his professional debut on 20 March 2011, starting in a 1–1 away draw against Real Cartagena for the Categoría Primera A championship.

Murillo scored his first senior goal on 27 May 2012, netting the last of a 3–0 home win against La Equidad. Ahead of the 2014 season, after falling down the pecking order, he was loaned to newcomers Uniautónoma for six months, but also featured rarely.

In January 2015, Murillo signed for Cúcuta Deportivo, becoming a regular starter for the side but suffering relegation. On 12 December 2016, he moved abroad for the first time in his career and joined Liga MX side Veracruz.

On 13 September 2019, Murillo returned to his home country and agreed to a contract with América de Cali.

Career statistics

Honours
América de Cali
Categoría Primera A: 2019 Clausura

References

External links
 
 

1992 births
Living people
People from Palmira, Valle del Cauca
Colombian footballers
Association football defenders
Categoría Primera A players
Categoría Primera B players
Deportivo Cali footballers
Uniautónoma F.C. footballers
Cúcuta Deportivo footballers
América de Cali footballers
Liga MX players
C.D. Veracruz footballers
Colombian expatriate footballers
Colombian expatriate sportspeople in Mexico
Expatriate footballers in Mexico
Sportspeople from Valle del Cauca Department